Lynen is a surname. Notable people with the surname include:

Amédée Lynen (1852–1938), Belgian painter
Feodor Lynen (1911–1979), German biochemist
Robert Lynen (1920–1944), French actor
Senne Lynen (born 1999), Belgian footballer

See also 
Feodor-Lynen-Gymnasium Planegg, government secondary school in Planegg in the German